Rochelle Hudson (born Rachael Elizabeth Hudson; March 6, 1916 – January 17, 1972) was an American film actress from the 1930s through the 1960s. Hudson was a WAMPAS Baby Star in 1931.

Early years
Hudson was born in Oklahoma City, Oklahoma, the daughter of Ollie Lee Hudson and Lenora Mae Hudson. While in Oklahoma, she studied dancing, drama, piano, and voice. She began her acting career as a teenager, and completed her high school education at a high school on the Fox studios lot.

Career
Hudson signed a contract with RKO Pictures on November 22, 1930, when she was 14 years old.

She may be best remembered today for costarring in Wild Boys of the Road (1933), playing Cosette in Les Misérables (1935), playing Mary Blair, the older sister of Shirley Temple's character in Curly Top, and for playing Natalie Wood's mother in Rebel Without a Cause (1955). During her peak years in the 1930s, notable roles for Hudson included Richard Cromwell’s love interest in the Will Rogers showcase Life Begins at 40 (1935), the daughter of carnival barker W.C. Fields in Poppy (1936), and Claudette Colbert’s adult daughter in Imitation of Life (1934). 

She played Sally Glynn, the fallen ingenue to whom Mae West imparts the immortal wisdom "When women go wrong, men go right after them!" in the 1933 Paramount film, She Done Him Wrong. In the 1954–1955 television season, Hudson co-starred with Gil Stratton and Eddie Mayehoff in the sitcom That's My Boy, based on a 1951 Jerry Lewis and Dean Martin film of the same name.

Personal life

Hudson was married four times. All the unions were childless. Her first marriage was to Harold Thompson, in 1939. He was the head of the Storyline Department at Disney Studios.

After their divorce in 1947, (but the trade publication Billboard reported that they divorced on September 4, 1945) she married a second time the following year to Los Angeles Times sportswriter Dick Irving Hyland. The marriage lasted two years before the couple divorced. She married her third husband, Charles K. Brust, in Jackson, Missouri on September 28, 1956. 

Little is known of the marriage other than they were divorced by June 1962 (he remarried). Her final marriage was to Robert Mindell, a hotel executive. The two remained together for eight years before they divorced in 1971.

She actually was born in 1916, but the studio reportedly made her two years older for her to play a wider variety of roles, including romantic roles. In That's My Boy, she was cast as the mother of Gil Stratton, who was only six years her junior.

Death
In 1972, Hudson was found dead in her home at the Palm Desert Country Club. A business associate with whom she had been working in real estate discovered her body sprawled on the bathroom floor. She was 55 years old. Hudson died of a heart attack brought on by a liver ailment.

Filmography

 Sinkin' in the Bathtub (1930 short) as Honey (uncredited voice)
 Laugh and Get Rich (1931) as Miss Jones - at Dance (uncredited)
 Everything's Rosie (1931) as Lowe Party Guest by Punch Bowl (uncredited)
 Fanny Foley Herself (1931) as Carmen
 Are These Our Children? (1931) as Mary
 Girl Crazy (1932) as San Luz Señorita (uncredited)
 Is My Face Red? (1932) as Newlywed Bride on Leviathon (uncredited)
 Beyond the Rockies (1932) as Betty Allen
 Hell's Highway (1932) as Mary Ellen
 Secrets of the French Police (1932) as K-31
 The Savage Girl (1932) as The Girl
 The Penguin Pool Murder (1932) as Telephone Operator
 The Past of Mary Holmes (1933) as Betty
 She Done Him Wrong (1933) as Sally
 Lucky Devils (1933) as Visitor
 Scarlet River (1933) as Rochelle Hudson (uncredited)
 Love Is Dangerous (1933)  as Gwendolyn
 Notorious But Nice (1933) as Constance Martin
 Doctor Bull (1933) as Virginia (Muller) / Banning
 Wild Boys of the Road (1933) as Grace
 Walls of Gold (1933) as Joan Street
 Mr. Skitch (1933) as Emily Skitch
 Harold Teen  (1934) as Lillian 'Lillums' Lovewell
 Such Women Are Dangerous (1934) as Vernie Little
 Bachelor Bait  (1934) as Cynthia Douglas
 Judge Priest (1934) as Virginia Maydew
 Imitation of Life (1934) as Jessie Pullman
 The Mighty Barnum (1934) as Ellen
 I've Been Around (1935) as Drue Waring
 Life Begins at 40 (1935) as Adele Anderson
 Les Misérables (1935) as Cosette
 Curly Top (1935) as Mary Blair
 Way Down East (1935) as Anna Moore
 Show Them No Mercy! (1935) as Loretta Martin
 The Music Goes 'Round (1936) as Susanna Courtney
 Everybody's Old Man (1936) as Cynthia Sampson
 The Country Beyond (1936) as Jean Alison
 Poppy (1936, with W.C. Fields) as Poppy
 Reunion (1936) as Mary MacKenzie
 Woman-Wise (1937) as Alice Fuller
 That I May Live (1937) as Irene Howard
 Born Reckless (1937) as Sybil Roberts
 She Had to Eat (1937) as Ann Garrison
 Rascals (1938) as Margaret Adams
 Mr. Moto Takes a Chance (1938) as Victoria Mason
 Storm Over Bengal (1938) as Joan Lattimore
 Pride of the Navy (1939) as Gloria Tyler
 Pirates of the Skies (1939) as Barbara Whitney
 Missing Daughters (1939) as Kay Roberts
 Smuggled Cargo (1939) as Marian Franklin
 Konga, the Wild Stallion (1939) as Judith Hadley
 A Woman Is the Judge (1939) as Justine West
 Convicted Woman (1940) as Betty Andrews
 Men Without Souls (1940) as Suzan Leonard
 Island of Doomed Men (1940) as Lorraine Danel
 Babies for Sale (1940) as Ruth Williams
 Girls Under 21 (1940) as Frances White Ryan
 Meet Boston Blackie (1941) as Cecelia Bradley
 The Stork Pays Off (1941) as Irene Perry
 The Officer and the Lady (1941) as Helen Regan
 Rubber Racketeers (1942) as Nikki
 Queen of Broadway (1942) as Sherry Baker
 Bush Pilot (1947) as Hilary Ward
 Devil's Cargo (1948) as Margo Delgado
 Sky Liner (1949) as Amy Winthrop
 Roots in the Soil (1949)
 Rebel Without a Cause (1955) as Judy's mother
 Strait-Jacket (1964) as Emily Cutler
 The Night Walker (1964) as Hilda
 Dr. Terror's Gallery of Horrors (1967) as Helen Spalding (final film role)

References

Sources
 Forty Years of Screen Credits, 1929-1969. Two volumes. Compiled by John T. Weaver. Metuchen, NJ: Scarecrow Press, 1970. Entries begin on page 57.
 Biography and Genealogy Master Index. Farmington Hills, Mich.: Gale, Cengage Learning. 1980–2009.

External links

 
 Photographs of Rochelle Hudson
 

1916 births
1972 deaths
American child actresses
American film actresses
Actresses from Oklahoma City
People from Palm Desert, California
20th-century American actresses
WAMPAS Baby Stars